The Scourge of the Swastika: A Short History of Nazi War Crimes is a 1954 non-fiction book by Edward Russell, 2nd Baron Russell of Liverpool.

Synopsis 
The book provides a brief history of the Nazi war crimes and features graphic photographic evidence.

Publication 
The book's publication resulted in great controversy. Russell was ordered by the government to withdraw the book's publication. About a week before its publication, he resigned his position of Assistant Judge Advocate General. The book was published by Cassell on 19 August 1954. The book quickly became an international bestseller, and remained a bestseller for years.

Reception 
In his review for the ABA Journal, U.S. Circuit Judge John J. Parker wrote that Russell "rendered a distinct public service in giving us a brief history of these war crimes in a form that the average man can read and understand."

Drew Middleton of The New York Times called it a "difficult" book for readers.

Legacy and influence 
The book has been cited as an early influence by novelist Howard Jacobson; The Scourge of the Swastika appears in Jacobson's novels The Mighty Walzer (1999) and Kalooki Nights (2006). It has also been cited by Hungarian-Canadian physician Gabor Maté, whose grandparents were killed in Auschwitz, as the "book that changed his life." The Scourge of the Swastika has also been cited as an influence by filmmaker Mark Forstater and as the first book read by activist Tony Greenstein, who said it influenced him to consider "how hateful human beings could be to other human beings."

References 

1954 non-fiction books
British non-fiction books
Cassell (publisher) books
History books about the Holocaust